Tee Jing Yi (born 8 February 1991 in George Town, Penang) is a Malaysian badminton player. She competed at the 2012 London and 2016 Rio Summer Olympics in the women's singles event.

Achievements

Asia Junior Championships
Girls' doubles

BWF International Challenge/Series
Women's singles

Women's doubles

 BWF International Challenge tournament
 BWF International Series tournament

References

External links
 
 

1991 births
Living people
Sportspeople from Penang
Malaysian sportspeople of Chinese descent
Malaysian female badminton players
Olympic badminton players of Malaysia
Badminton players at the 2012 Summer Olympics
Badminton players at the 2016 Summer Olympics
Badminton players at the 2010 Asian Games
Badminton players at the 2014 Asian Games
Commonwealth Games gold medallists for Malaysia
Commonwealth Games medallists in badminton
Badminton players at the 2014 Commonwealth Games
Southeast Asian Games medalists in badminton
Southeast Asian Games silver medalists for Malaysia
Southeast Asian Games bronze medalists for Malaysia
Competitors at the 2011 Southeast Asian Games
Competitors at the 2015 Southeast Asian Games
Asian Games competitors for Malaysia
21st-century Malaysian women
Medallists at the 2014 Commonwealth Games